1000M (formerly referred to as 1000 South Michigan) is a skyscraper under construction in the Historic Michigan Boulevard District portion of Michigan Avenue in the Chicago Loop. The 323-unit building will include one to four bedroom luxury condominiums. Construction on 1000M officially began in December 2019 and was originally expected to finish in mid-to-late 2022.

Location 
The building will be located in what is now a vacant lot at 1000 South Michigan in the Historic Michigan Boulevard District in downtown Chicago, Illinois. The site borders the  Lightner Building at 1006 South Michigan and the  Karpen-Standard Oil Building at 910 South Michigan. Located on the edge of Grant Park, the building will have views of the park and Lake Michigan. As part of the "Cultural Mile," the building is located near the Art Institute of Chicago, Museum Campus, Harold Washington Library, the Chicago Cultural Center and Magdalena Abakanowicz’s  Agora sculpture.

Architecture 
The building has been designed by architect Helmut Jahn who is known for his works across the globe including the Messeturm in Frankfurt, CitySpire, the Park Avenue Tower, 50 West Street and 425 Lexington Avenue in New York City.

The building is a joint venture between New York-based JK Equities and New York-based Time Equities, and Oak Capitals. Ethan Coleman, the development manager for Time Equities, and Jordan Karlik, a founder of JK Equities, talked to Crain’s Chicago Business about the design in March 2017. Coleman said the design of the tower "is something that really maximizes the light and views that residents will have." Karlik added of the architect, "Helmut was very passionate" about the exterior design of 1000 South Michigan Avenue.

The tower will be largely composed of glass with a greenish hue with metal horizontal spandrels flanking each floor. The tower is capped with a crown screened in metallic mesh. The tower's crown will serve more than aesthetic purposes—it will also act as a large amenity roof deck area that spans the eastern building wall. Natural-finished aluminum spandrels, or bands between floors of the building, will create the image of a lightweight building. 1000M will also have east-facing terraces.

Interior design 
Kara Mann, of Kara Mann Design, will design the 323 individual residences and nearly 40,000 square feet of indoor and outdoor amenity space. Mann will also provide residents on the upper floors with the option to have their outdoor spaces staged and decorated. Kitchens will be outfitted with custom cabinetry and Sub-Zero and Wolf appliances; master suites will feature bathrooms with oversized showers and soaking tubs. Mann said she wanted the interiors to have "a purity and lightness." The building will also have a two-story lobby.

Previous building designs 
According to Crain's Chicago Business, plans for the building were released in August 2015. Although the historic district zoning has height restrictions of 425 feet (129.5m), on September 23, 2015 the City Clerk of Chicago's website posted that the building is planned to have a rooftop terrace that reaches  according to Dennis Rodkin of Crain's Chicago Business. Over a month later, Blair Kamin of the Chicago Tribune stated that the plan was to be for a  tower. The plan was approved on April 22, 2016. Instead of the more common setback architectural design, the original building would have had overhangs on its south face with rising cubes that are successively larger that present a "striking, if somewhat precarious, effect" according to the Pulitzer Prize-winning Blair Kamin.

Based on an October 29, 2015 presentation, the planned 506-unit building was to include 358 condominiums and 148 rental apartments between the  Lightner Building at 1006 South Michigan and the  Karpen-Standard Oil Building at 910 South Michigan on what has been a vacant lot. The early designs for the building included an 85th-floor roof deck for condo residents. The property, which overlooks Grant Park, had been owned by Warren Barr who had plans for a 40-story condominium tower until he lost ownership through foreclosure to First American Bank in a July 2010 proceeding that saw the property sell for $11.3 million. If completed, the building will surpass the  Metropolitan Tower at 310 South Michigan as the Historic Michigan Boulevard District's tallest structure. It will also become the tallest building in the city south of the Willis Tower. Even after the shorter redesign, the building retained the claim as the tallest building along Michigan Avenue in the Historic Michigan Boulevard District across from Grant Park.

Height 

Commission on Chicago Landmarks has jurisdiction over the proposal due to its placement in the Historic District. In February 2016, The Landmark Commission considered formalizing a  height restriction in the region of the historic district between 8th and 11th streets.

If completed, the building will surpass the  Metropolitan Tower at 310 South Michigan as the Historic Michigan Boulevard District's tallest structure. It will also become the tallest building in the city south of the Willis Tower. Even after the shorter redesign, the building retained the claim as the tallest building along Michigan Avenue in the Historic Michigan Boulevard District across from Grant Park and the 13th tallest building in the City of Chicago.

Amenities 
Amenities include an acoustically engineered music performance room overlooking Grant Park, a yoga room with a wall-sized video screen for an immersive experience of doing yoga or meditating, and a golf simulator room where the concierge can set up tee times at virtual versions of some of the world's top courses. There will also be Himalayan salt therapy room and an outdoor swimming pool with cabanas, a cookout area and gardens. On the 72nd floor, Club 1000, a full-service bar and lounge, will feature a sky terrace with telescopes and sculpture benches that overlook Lake Michigan.

Construction 

The 1000M Sales Gallery  at 1006 S. Michigan Avenue  has a scale model of the tower and a model unit that shows Kara Mann's interior design.  Also in the Sales Gallery, a video wall nine feet high and 28 feet wide displays the view as would be seen from whatever unit a potential buyer is considering, thanks to extensive footage shot using helicopters and drones. Construction was temporarily halted due to the COVID-19 pandemic.

See also
List of tallest buildings in Chicago
List of tallest buildings in the United States

References

Helmut Jahn buildings
Proposed buildings and structures in Illinois
Proposed skyscrapers in the United States
Residential skyscrapers in Chicago
Residential condominiums in Chicago
Buildings and structures under construction in the United States